The 1965–66 Southern Football League season was the 63rd in the history of the league, an English football competition.

Weymouth won the championship for the second time in a row, whilst Barnet, Bath City, Burton Albion and Hillingdon Borough were all promoted to the Premier Division. Nine Southern League clubs applied to join the Football League at the end of the season, but none were successful.

Premier Division
The Premier Division consisted of 22 clubs, including 18 clubs from the previous season and four new clubs, promoted from Division One:
Corby Town
Hereford United
Poole Town
Wimbledon

League table

Division One
Division One expanded up to 24 clubs, including 18 clubs from the previous season and six new clubs:
Four clubs relegated from the Premier Division:
Bath City
Bexley United
Hastings United
Wisbech Town

Plus:
Barnet, joined from the Athenian League
Dunstable Town, joined from the Metropolitan League

League table

Football League elections
Alongside the four League clubs facing re-election, a total of 14 non-League clubs applied for election, including nine Southern League clubs. All four League clubs were re-elected.

References
RSSF – Southern Football League archive

Southern Football League seasons
S